Marko Mišura (born 21 June 1971) is a Croatian sailor. He competed in the men's 470 event at the 1996 Summer Olympics.

References

External links
 

1971 births
Living people
Croatian male sailors (sport)
Olympic sailors of Croatia
Sailors at the 1996 Summer Olympics – 470
Sportspeople from Split, Croatia